Naked Fury is a 1959 British crime thriller directed by Charles Saunders.  In the United States, it was re-titled The Pleasure Lovers.

Synopsis

Four criminals attack a night watchman while robbing a warehouse. After kidnapping the daughter of their victim, they hide. One of the robbers falls for their hostage, leading to tension between the thieves, especially when the night watchman succumbs to his injuries.

Cast
 Reed De Rouen as Eddy 
 Kenneth Cope as Johnny 
 Leigh Madison as Carol 
 Arthur Lovegrove as Syd 
 Alexander Field as Vic 
 Tommy Eytle as Steve 
 Ann Lynn as Stella 
 Marianne Brauns as Joy 
 Arthur Gross as Tom Parker 
 Redmond Phillips as Inspector Stevens 
 Eric Woodburn as Frank Hawking
 Denis Shaw as Captain Horst

References

External links
 

1959 films
British crime thriller films
Films directed by Charles Saunders
Films shot at Associated British Studios
1950s English-language films
1950s British films